Mariia Oleksandrivna Kichasova-Skoryk, nee Kichasova (born 20 July 1993) is a Ukrainian canoeist. 

She won medals at the European Championships. At the 2017 European championships in Plovdiv, Bulgaria, she became in pair with Anastasiya Horlova European champion in K-2 200m.

She qualified in the  women's K-1 200 metres, and women's K-4 500 metres events at the 2020 Summer Olympics.

References

1993 births
Living people
Ukrainian female canoeists
Sportspeople from Poltava
European Games competitors for Ukraine
Canoeists at the 2015 European Games
Canoeists at the 2019 European Games
Canoeists at the 2020 Summer Olympics
Olympic canoeists of Ukraine